The Little River is a  tributary of the Savannah River in the U.S. state of Georgia.

See also
List of rivers of Georgia

References

USGS Hydrologic Unit Map - State of Georgia (1974)

Rivers of Georgia (U.S. state)
Tributaries of the Savannah River
Rivers of Columbia County, Georgia